Borovoy (Borovöj) is an urban locality (an urban-type settlement) under the administrative jurisdiction of the town of republic significance of Ukhta in the Komi Republic, Russia. As of the 2010 Census, its population was 1,560.

Administrative and municipal status
Within the framework of administrative divisions, the urban-type settlement of Borovoy, together with one rural locality (the settlement of Tobys), is incorporated as Borovoy Urban-Type Settlement Administrative Territory, which is subordinated to the town of republic significance of Ukhta. Within the framework of municipal divisions, Borovoy is a part of Ukhta Urban Okrug.

References

Notes

Sources

Urban-type settlements in the Komi Republic
